The 1956 Pacific typhoon season has no official bounds; it ran year-round in 1956, but most tropical cyclones tend to form in the northwestern Pacific Ocean between June and December. These dates conventionally delimit the period of each year when most tropical cyclones form in the northwestern Pacific Ocean.

The scope of this article is limited to the Pacific Ocean, north of the equator and west of the international date line. Storms that form east of the date line and north of the equator are called hurricanes; see 1956 Pacific hurricane season. Tropical storms forming in the entire west Pacific basin were assigned a name by the Fleet Weather Center on Guam.

Systems 

A total of 39 tropical cyclones are made in the Western Pacific Basin. Of all the 39 tropical cyclones made, 23 of them reached tropical storm strength, 15 of them reached typhoon strength, and 3 of them reached the super typhoon strength. The rest of the storms, such as unnumbered and unnamed tropical depressions and storms, are only classified by the CMA while the JMA is sometimes rare before the 1960s - 1970s.

Typhoon Sarah 

Typhoon Sarah formed at a low latitude on March 21 and took a generally northwest heading. On the 31st as it approached the Philippine islands, it slowed then reversed its direction dissipating on April 4.

Tropical Storm 02W 

Tropical Storm 02W formed on April 10. It hit Philippines as a tropical depression. It move westward hitting Vietnam dissipating on April 15.

Typhoon Thelma 

On April 16, Thelma formed near the formation place of typhoon Sarah. Thelma struck the Philippine Islands on April 21 and passed close to Formosa on April 23 then struck Japan. The U.S. Navy Fleet Weather Central in Guam stopped following Thelma on April 25.

Tropical Storm 04W

Typhoon Vera

Typhoon Wanda 

A tropical depression developed southwest of Guam on July 25. It moved north-northeastward, passing east of the Northern Marianas. On July 27, it intensified into a tropical storm and was designated Wanda. On the same day, the storm turned more westward, steered by the subtropical ridge to the north. Low wind shear and warm waters allowed Wanda to intensify steadily, developing into an intense typhoon. After passing through the Miyako Islands, Wanda weakened slightly and traversed the East China Sea. Wanda slowly weakened while progressing through China, dissipating on August 5.

Taipei on Taiwan recorded  of rainfall over three days while the typhoon passed to the north. Along the coast of Zhejiang, Wanda produced a  storm surge that destroyed 465 seawalls and 902 boats. The storm also flooded crop fields, destroying 20,380 tons of wheat. Across Zhejiang, 2.2 million houses and 38.5% of the main roads were damaged during the storm. Nationwide, Wanda killed 4,935 people and injured 16,617 others.

Typhoon Amy

Tropical Storm 08W

Typhoon Babs

Typhoon Charlotte

Typhoon Dinah 

Typhoon Dinah was formed on August 25. The storm increased rapidly before hitting northern Taiwan. The typhoon made landfall on Fujian before turning through China and North Korea. It dissipated over the Soviet Union/Russia on September 5.

Typhoon Emma 

Emma left 77 people dead and over $8 million (1956 USD) in damage.
Forming from a tropical disturbance near the Mariana Islands, Emma churned southwest before gaining typhoon status on September 3. Emma then recurved after reaching category 3 status. Emma also brushed South Korea and Kyushu as a strong category 3 typhoon. On Kyushu, Emma brought 22 inches of rain that caused extensive flooding with left 34 people dead and thousands homeless. On South Korea, Emma sank dozens of ships and wrecked homes and buildings. In all 42 people were dead and 35 missing, most of them are fishermen. On Okinawa, most headed typhoon watches are choosing to evacuate or bolting storm shutters and stowing avay light equipment. A strong rip current had overwhelmed the soldiers and all of the eleven marines drowned. When Emma hit Okinawa, it brought  gusts that ripped apart runways and smashed hangars. Heavy rains brought flashfloods that damaged homes and buildings. A total of  fell at Kadena Air Force Base in 21 hours on September 8. The U.S. held island of Okinawa was hard hit by Emma. Numerous planes, runways, and barracks are damaged. Emma left on hat battering island, leaving $8 million (1956 US dollars in damage). Emma then dissipated on September 11. Emma was one of the several typhoons that cause significant damage to Okinawa during the mid-1950s.

Typhoon Freda 
Freda hit Taiwan and China. Its remnants spread all the way to the Alaskan Islands.

Typhoon Gilda

Typhoon Harriet 

Harriet formed on September 19. It was a moderately powerful typhoon that brought heavy and 110 mph winds to Japan. The typhoon destroyed 600 buildings and killed 38 people. Harriet then crossed the Sea of Japan before making the second landfall in South Korea. There, the storm brought heavy rains and gusty winds before dissipating on September 27. Harriet killed 53 people and left $50 million (1956) dollars in damage.

Typhoon Ivy

Typhoon Jean

Tropical Storm 18W

Typhoon Karen-Lucille

Typhoon Mary 
Mary was a short-lived typhoon that never impacted land.

Typhoon Nadine 
Nadine was a typhoon that stalled and then weakened, Nadine never made landfall.

Typhoon Olive 
Olive tracked across the Philippines as a hurricane.

Typhoon Polly 

The last storm of the season, Polly formed on December 7. It reached its peak intensity with 105 mph winds. It made landfall in Philippines as a category 2 typhoon and this made Polly to weaken to a tropical storm and dissipated. On Philippines, Polly brought 105 mph winds and 11 inch rains in the Philippines on December 8. The typhoon killed 79 people and left $2.5 million (1956 dollars) in damage.

Storm names 
These are the names used in 1956. This is the same used in the 1952 season, with the exception of Jean, Lucille and Nadine which replaced Jeanne, Lois and Nona.

See also 

 List of Pacific typhoon seasons
 1956 Atlantic hurricane season
 1956 Pacific hurricane season
 Australian region cyclone seasons: 1955–56 1956–57
 South Pacific cyclone seasons: 1955–56 1956–57
 South-West Indian Ocean cyclone seasons: 1955–56 1956–57

References

External links 
 Japan Meteorological Agency
 Joint Typhoon Warning Center .
 China Meteorological Agency
 National Weather Service Guam
 Hong Kong Observatory
 Macau Meteorological Geophysical Services
 Korea Meteorological Agency
 Philippine Atmospheric, Geophysical and Astronomical Services Administration
 Taiwan Central Weather Bureau
 Digital Typhoon - Typhoon Images and Information
 Typhoon2000 Philippine typhoon website